Elisa Konofagou is a Greek biomedical engineer in the field of medical ultrasound. She is the Robert and Margaret Hariri Professor of Biomedical Engineering and Radiology (Physics) at Columbia University in New York. Konofagou is a fellow of the Acoustical Society of America and the American Institute for Medical and Biological Engineering, and she received the NSF CAREER Award in 2007.

Education 
Konofagou graduated with her bachelor's degree in electrical engineering at Paris VI University and master's degree  from Imperial College in 1992 and 1993, respectively. She received her Doctorate of Philosophy in 1999 from the University of Houston for her research in elastography at the University of Texas Medical School. She completed postdoctoral research in elasticity-based monitoring of focused ultrasound therapy at Brigham and Women's Hospital. She received a Fulbright U.S. Inter-country Award in 2019.

Career

Research interests 
Konofagou heads the Ultrasound Elasticity and Imaging Laboratory (UEIL), which works on developing novel ultrasound techniques for imaging and therapeutics.  Her main interests are related to elasticity imaging, including harmonic motion imaging, pulse wave imaging, and electromechanical wave imaging. The clinical foci of the UEIL include breast, ligament, and myocardial elastography, as well as focused ultrasound therapy related to the blood-brain barrier. Konofagou maintains several clinical collaborations with the Columbia Presbyterian Medical Center.

Teaching 
Konofagou was an instructor and postdoctoral fellow at Bringham Women's Hospital (Harvard Medical School) from 2002–2003. Subsequently, she gained assistant (2003) and associate (2009) professorship roles in the departments of radiology and biomedical engineering at Columbia University. She is currently a professor of biomedical engineering and radiology at Columbia. She also served as the graduate chair of biomedical engineering in 2015.

Awards 
Awards received by Konofagou include:
 Young Investigator Award, Acoustical Society of America, 2002
 New Investigator Award, American Institute of Ultrasound in Medicine, 2006
 CAREER Award, National Science Foundation, 2007
 Nagy Award by the National Institute of Biomedical Imaging and Bioengineering – NIH, 2007
 Fellow, American Institute for Medical and Biological Engineering, 2014
 Fellow, Acoustical Society of America, 2017
 Bodossaki Foundation Award of Scientific Excellence in Applied Science, 2017

References 

Year of birth missing (living people)

Living people
Pierre and Marie Curie University alumni
Biomedical engineers
University of Houston alumni
Members of the National Academy of Medicine